is a Japanese footballer who plays for SC Sagamihara.

Club statistics
Updated to 23 February 2018.

References

External links
Profile at Ventforet Kofu

Profile at Kataller Toyama

1991 births
Living people
Hannan University alumni
Association football people from Tokyo
Japanese footballers
J1 League players
J2 League players
J3 League players
Tokushima Vortis players
Kataller Toyama players
Ventforet Kofu players
Thespakusatsu Gunma players
SC Sagamihara players
Association football midfielders
Universiade bronze medalists for Japan
Universiade medalists in football
Medalists at the 2013 Summer Universiade